The American International Yellow Jackets is composed of 22 teams representing American International College in intercollegiate athletics, including men’s and women's basketball, cross country, golf, lacrosse, soccer, track and field, and volleyball. Men's sports include baseball, football, ice hockey, and wrestling. Women's sports include field hockey, rugby, softball, and tennis. The Yellow Jackets compete in NCAA Division II and are members of the Northeast-10 Conference for all sports except ice hockey, which competes in NCAA Division I; wrestling, which is NCAA Division II Independent; and women's triathlon and men's volleyball, which compete as de facto Division I independents. The men's ice hockey team is a member of Atlantic Hockey Division I.

History 
The Yellow Jackets started competing in the 1933–1934 academic season in football, men's basketball and baseball. Men's soccer was added just one year later. The athletic department grew to five teams in the winter of 1948 when the Yellow Jackets started their ice hockey team.

Twenty years later, AIC introduced its first women's sport, softball. Judy Groff was introduced as the first softball coach, a position she held for 42 seasons. Volleyball, which was invented down the road in Holyoke, Massachusetts, started in the fall of 1974 with Groff also taking the reins.

In the 1977–1978 school year, AIC began competing in women's basketball and men's golf. It would be seven years before the athletic department grew again when they added women's soccer for the 1985 school year.

With the emergence of lacrosse in the Northeast, the Yellow Jackets added men's lacrosse in the spring of 1992. In 1996-97, field hockey and women's lacrosse were added to the department to bring the women's teams total to six.

Ten years later, the Yellow Jackets added six teams to their already extensive department in men's and women's cross country, men's and women's indoor track, and men's and women's outdoor track.

In 2018, the department added women's golf.

With the backing of USA Triathlon, American International College became the 24th team in the nation to introduce a women's varsity triathlon program to its athletic department, Director of Athletics Matthew Johnson announced on Tuesday, May 29 AIC expected competition to begin in the fall of 2019.

During the fall of 2020, the department announced the addition of men's volleyball as the 26th sport sponsored by the department. The team started play in January 2022.

Varsity sports

NCAA appearances 
 Ice Hockey: 2019, 2021, 2022
 Baseball: 1991
 Men's Basketball: 1966, 1967, 1968, 1969, 1970, 1983, 1984, 1985, 1994, 2000, 2010, 2015
 Elite Eight: 1968, 1969, 1970, 1985
 Men's Cross Country: 2012, 2014, 2016, 2017
 Football: 2008, 2013
 Men's Golf: 2008, 2009, 2010, 2011, 2012, 2014, 2015
 Women's Basketball: 1995, 1996, 2000, 2001, 2002, 2004, 2005, 2006, 2007, 2009, 2016
 Elite Eight: 2002, 2006
 National Finalist: 2006
 Field Hockey: 2010, 2011
 Women's Soccer: 1998, 2010, 2012, 2013, 2016
 Final Four: 2013
 Softball: 1985, 1987, 1989, 1990, 1993, 1994, 1995, 1996, 1997, 1998, 1999, 2001, 2002, 2003
 World Series: 1996, 1997
 Volleyball: 2010, 2016, 2017, 2018
 Elite Eight: 2016, 2018

Club sports
AIC also has a college rugby program that was founded in 2009 and began play in 2010. The rugby program is part of the school's athletic department, has varsity status, with rugby scholarships available for students. AIC plays in Division I in the D1A Conference.

Notable alumni
 Romina Bell, Austrian football defender , playing for FC Neunkirch in the Swiss Nationalliga A.
 Jim Calhoun , Hall of Fame basketball coach
 Asnage Castelly, Olympic Games 1st Haitian wrestler in Summer Olympics in the 74 kg freestyle competition also the flag bearer of the Haitian delegation for the Olympics opening.
 Mario Elie, NBA guard
 Dave Forbes, NHL hockey player
 John Gibbons, First African American U.S. Marshall for the District 
 Jānis Jaks, Professional Hockey player
 Brennan Kapcheck, Professional Hockey player
 Bruce Laird, NFL safety for the Baltimore Colts
 Tom Rychlec, NFL and AFL tight end for several teams
 Gashi, rapper

Facilities

References

External links